Igor Sinyutin (born 3 January 1974) is a Russian former competitive figure skater. He is the 1995 Grand Prix International St. Gervais silver medalist and 1996 Nebelhorn Trophy bronze medalist. Sinyutin presently coaches in Spain.

Career

Competitive career 
Sinyutin started skating in 1980 in Kuybyshev (now Samara), Russia, with first coach Lyubov Zgirova. In 1986, he moved to a different sport club, "Kriliya Sovetov", and started working with coach Galina Belyashova and choreographer Tatiana Mihalkina.

Show career 
In 1998, Sinyutin joined Feld Entertainment. He began as a chorus skater in "Wizard of Oz on Ice" until 2000. From 2000 to 2004 he performed in Disney on Ice ice shows. He played the principal role of the Beast in Beauty and the Beast and understudy of Gaston. He also played the principal role of Woody in "Toy Story 2". In 2004–05, he performed in Royal Caribbean International's "Adventures of the Seas" and "Mariner of the Seas". In May 2005, he returned to Disney on Ice to perform in The Incredibles in Disneyland Adventures, playing the main role of Mr. Incredible until April 2009.

Coaching career 
In October 2009, Sinyutin started his coaching career with Aramon Club Hielo Jaca in Jaca, Spain. In 2011, he received his coaching level 2 certificate. He served as the coach and choreographer of Spanish skaters Marta García (senior and junior level) and Victoria Rodriguez (novice level).

In 2013, Sinyutin joined Hielo Bipolo, a club in Vitoria-Gasteiz, as the director of its figure skating division.

Competitive highlights

References 

Living people
Russian figure skating coaches
Russian male single skaters
Sportspeople from Samara, Russia
1974 births